Kim Ha-on (born July 7, 2000), better known simply as Haon, is a South Korean rapper. He is the winner of High School Rapper 2. He appeared as a contestant on both High School Rapper 1 and  High School Rapper 2. He released his first EP, Travel: Noah, on September 5, 2018.

Career

Debut

In 2018, Haon participated in Mnet's reality show, High School Rapper 2 and finished in 1st placed overall. He released his first EP on September 5, 2018, titled Travel: Noah.

Discography

Extended plays

Singles

Filmography

Television shows

Awards and nominations

References

2000 births
Living people
Rappers from Seoul
South Korean male rappers
South Korean hip hop singers
21st-century South Korean male  singers